The 1931 Chicago Cubs season was the 60th season of the Chicago Cubs franchise, the 56th in the National League and the 16th at Wrigley Field. The Cubs finished third in the National League with a record of 84–70, 17 games behind the St. Louis Cardinals.

Offseason 
 October 14, 1930: Bill McAfee and Wes Schulmerich were traded by the Cubs to the Boston Braves for Bob Smith and Jimmy Welsh.

Regular season 
1931 was one of player-manager Rogers Hornsby's last productive seasons. He managed to drive in 90 runs and collect 37 doubles in only 100 games, while recording a batting average of .331. He led the league in on-base percentage (.421) for the ninth and last time in his career.

Season standings

Record vs. opponents

Notable transactions 
 June 13, 1931: Earl Grace was traded by the Cubs to the Pittsburgh Pirates for Rollie Hemsley.

Roster

Player stats

Batting

Starters by position 
Note: Pos = Position; G = Games played; AB = At bats; H = Hits; Avg. = Batting average; HR = Home runs; RBI = Runs batted in

Other batters 
Note: G = Games played; AB = At bats; H = Hits; Avg. = Batting average; HR = Home runs; RBI = Runs batted in

Pitching

Starting pitchers 
Note: G = Games pitched; IP = Innings pitched; W = Wins; L = Losses; ERA = Earned run average; SO = Strikeouts

Other pitchers 
Note: G = Games pitched; IP = Innings pitched; W = Wins; L = Losses; ERA = Earned run average; SO = Strikeouts

Relief pitchers 
Note: G = Games pitched; W = Wins; L = Losses; SV = Saves; ERA = Earned run average; SO = Strikeouts

Farm system

References

External links
1931 Chicago Cubs season at Baseball Reference

Chicago Cubs seasons
Chicago Cubs season
Chicago Cubs